Hassan Ben Badida born in Casablanca in 1960, is a Moroccan actor.

Biography 
Hassan Ben Badida made his artistic debut by staging a play on the stage of the Youth Center for Arts, And become popular to Moroccan audience, ⁣ especially after his roles in film They're the dogs in the 2013 directed by Hicham Lasri, ⁣ After that Hour of Hell television film.

Filmography

Series

References

External links 

  
 Allociné

1960 births
Living people
21st-century Moroccan male actors
Moroccan male film actors
Moroccan male television actors
People from Casablanca